The Anarchiad (1786–87) is an American mock-epic poem that reflected Federalist concerns during the formation of the United States. The Anarchiad, or American Antiquities: A Poem on the Restoration of Chaos and Substantial Night was penned by four members of the Hartford Wits: David Humphreys, John Trumbull, Joel Barlow, and Lemuel Hopkins. It was serialized in 12 parts in The New Haven Gazette and Connecticut Magazine between October 26, 1786 and September 13, 1787.

The Anarchiad drew inspiration from Alexander Pope's satiric epics like The Dunciad and James MacPherson's forged Ossian cycle of epic poems, which inspired the pseudo-classical setting as a vehicle for satire. The poem purported to be fragments of an ancient heroic poem unearthed in ruined fortifications to the west. As a literary counterpart to The Federalist Papers, the poem criticized the dysfunctional Articles of Confederation, demanded a stronger central government, and rebuked the Anti-Federalists for permitting "Anarch" (Chaos) to reign over the fledgling republic. Connecticut's Anti-Federalists came in for particular opprobrium. The authors repeatedly nodded to Shays' Rebellion as a harbinger of the Republic's dissolution.

References

External links 

 Full text of poem

American poems
American satirical poems
Hartford Wits
1786 poems
1787 poems
American political satire
18th-century American literature